The 1987-88 NBA season was the Kings' 39th season in the NBA and third in Sacramento. Playing under two coaches Bill Russell, and Jerry Reynolds during the season, the Kings finished sixth in the Midwest Division with a 24–58 record. Top draft pick Kenny Smith made the All-Rookie Team. Following the season, Otis Thorpe was traded to the Houston Rockets for Rodney McCray, LaSalle Thompson was traded to the Indiana Pacers for Wayman Tisdale, and the Kings moved out of ARCO Arena I for ARCO Arena II.

Draft picks

Roster

Regular season

Season standings

z - clinched division title
y - clinched division title
x - clinched playoff spot

Record vs. opponents

Game log

Regular season

|-style="background:#fcc;"
| 12
| December 1, 19877:30 pm PST
| L.A. Lakers
| L 120–125 (OT)
|
|
|
| ARCO Arena10,333
| 4–8
|-style="background:#fcc;"
| 24
| December 23, 19877:30 pm PST
| @ L.A. Lakers
| L 103–117
|
|
|
| The Forum17,505
| 6–18

|-style="background:#fcc;"
| 39
| January 28, 19887:30 pm PST
| L.A. Lakers
| L 94–115
|
|
|
| ARCO Arena10,333
| 11–28

|-style="background:#fcc;"
| 52
| February 23, 19887:30 pm PST
| Detroit
| L 105–121
|
|
|
| ARCO Arena10,333
| 16–36

|-style="background:#fcc;"
| 62
| March 14, 19884:30 pm PST
| @ Detroit
| L 97–109
|
|
|
| Pontiac Silverdome16,909
| 18–44
|-style="background:#cfc;"
| 68
| March 26, 19887:30 pm PST
| L.A. Lakers
| W 114–92
|
|
|
| ARCO Arena10,333
| 20–48

|-style="background:#fcc;"
| 72
| April 3, 19887:30 pm PDT
| @ L.A. Lakers
| L 104–108
|
|
|
| The Forum17,505
| 20–52

Player statistics

Awards and records
 Kenny Smith, NBA All-Rookie Team 1st Team

Transactions

References

See also
 1987-88 NBA season

Sacramento Kings seasons
Sacramento
Sacramento
Sacramento